Faith Bromberg (1919– June 19, 1990) was an American painter active within the feminist art movement. Her work often featured figurative paintings in mixed mediums.

Biography 
Born in Los Angeles in 1919. Bromberg attended Sacramento Junior College, the University of California at Los Angeles, the Otis Art Institute, and the Los Angeles School of Fine Arts, and had lessons with Wayne Thiebaud and June Wayne. In 1980 she received a fellowship from the National Endowment for the Arts, and in 1975 and 1976 she won awards from the American Academy and Institute of Arts and Letters. She showed work in numerous exhibits, both solo and group, during her career. Active in feminist art groups as well, she contributed to Feminist Art Journal and took an active role in Womanspace and Women's Caucus for the Arts, among others. Her paintings were often worked in oil and spray paint.

References

External links 
 The Faith Bromberg collection from Smithsonian Institution's online virtual archive

1919 births
1990 deaths
American women painters
20th-century American painters
20th-century American women artists
University of California, Los Angeles alumni
Otis College of Art and Design alumni
National Endowment for the Arts Fellows
Artists from Los Angeles
Painters from California
Sacramento City College alumni
Feminist artists